Diamond Valley is a valley basin between the Sulphur Spring Range and the Diamond Mountains, in central Nevada, the Western United States.

Geography

The valley is almost entirely within Eureka County, but the northern end crosses into Elko County.

The town of Eureka lies at the southern end of Diamond Valley, while the northern end is home to an alkali flat. Several small lakes are located in the western part of the valley near Sadler Brown Road. Eureka Airport is also located towards the southern end of the valley.

Agriculture
Diamond Valley is also known for their farms that grow Timothy hay, Alfalfa hay, wheat, oats, and orchard grass. The hay provides feed for racetracks, dairies, and feed stores throughout the United States and foreign export market

References
 Nevada Atlas & Gazetteer, 2001, pgs. 39 & 47

 

Valleys of Nevada
Valleys of Eureka County, Nevada
Valleys of Elko County, Nevada